Luis Fernández Oliveira (born 19 January 1980) is a Spanish former road cyclist. He rode professionally from 2006 to 2009, and competed in the 2006 Vuelta a España.

Major results
2004
 1st Overall Tour of Galicia
 1st Overall Vuelta al Goierri
 1st Stage 2 Bizkaiko Bira
2005
 1st Overall Volta a Coruña

References

External links

1980 births
Living people
Spanish male cyclists
Sportspeople from O Porriño
Cyclists from Galicia (Spain)